Charles Henry Laws (21 January 1867–8 February 1958) was a New Zealand Methodist minister and administrator. He was born in Newcastle upon Tyne, Northumberland, England, on 21 January 1867.

References

1867 births
1958 deaths
People from Newcastle upon Tyne
New Zealand Methodist ministers
English emigrants to New Zealand